Stâna River may refer to the following rivers in Romania:

 Stâna, a tributary of the Bistrița in Neamț County
 Stâna, a tributary of the Camenca in Bacău County
 Stâna, a tributary of the Priboiasa in Vâlcea County

Others 
 Gropșoarele Stână, a tributary of the Gropșoarele in Prahova County
 Izvorul Stânei, a tributary of the Latorița in Vâlcea County
 Pârâul Stânei, a tributary of the Bâsca Mică in Buzău County

See also 
 Stâna (disambiguation)
 Stânișoara River (disambiguation)
 Valea Stânei River (disambiguation)